Denis Viktorovich Gruzhevsky (born 10 March 2000) is a Belarusian professional footballer who plays for Shakhtyor Soligorsk.

Honours
Shakhtyor Soligorsk
Belarusian Premier League champion: 2022
Belarusian Super Cup winner: 2023

References

External links 
 
 

2000 births
Living people
People from Smarhon’
Sportspeople from Grodno Region
Belarusian footballers
Association football defenders
FC Minsk players
FC Smorgon players
FC Sputnik Rechitsa players
FC Torpedo-BelAZ Zhodino players
FC Shakhtyor Soligorsk players